The 1981–82 West Virginia Mountaineers men's basketball team represented West Virginia University as a member of the Eastern Athletic Association during the 1981-82 season. The team played their home games at WVU Coliseum in Morgantown, West Virginia. Led by 4th-year head coach Gale Catlett, the Mountaineers took home the conference regular season title and received an at-large bid to the 1982 NCAA Tournament as No. 5 seed in the West region.

Roster

Schedule and results

|-
!colspan=9 style=| Regular Season

|-
!colspan=9 style=| EAA Tournament

|-
!colspan=9 style=| NCAA Tournament

Rankings

References

West Virginia
West Virginia Mountaineers men's basketball seasons
West Virginia Mountaineers men's basketball
West Virginia Mountaineers men's basketball
West Virginia